Durango Blues Train features live blues music on the historic Durango & Silverton Narrow Gauge, coal-fired, steam-powered train. Over two weekends at the end of the summer, enjoy blues music while riding through some of Colorado's most beautiful canyons.

Guests
The 2017 artist line-up has not been released yet.

The June 2015 line-up featured Ben Miller Band, Moreland & Arbuckle, Eagle Eye Williamson, Cary Morin, The Bones of J.R. Jones, and Brian Keith Wallen.

The May 2015 lineup featured Dragondeer, Dan Treanor's Afrosippi Band with Erica Brown and MJ, Cary Morin, A.J. Fullerton featuring Big John Shrader, Grant Sabin, and Mark "Porkchop" Holder.
The August 2015 lineup featured Mark May Band, The King Stan Band, Possessed By Paul James, Charlie Parr, Reverend Deadeye, and Big Jim Adam.

In 2014, the event featured Big Sam's Funky Nation, Todd & The Fox, Robby Overfield, The Bottoms Up Blues Gang, Eddie Turner, C.W. Ayon, Johnny Long, Chris Dracup, Gino Matteo, Matthew Curry and the Fury, Alex Maryol, Kirk James, Kipori Woods, Leon J, One Roof Blues, Scotty Spenner, Franco Paletta, Rockin' Jake, Donny Morales, Valerie James, and Kevin Jones.

References

Folk festivals in the United States
Blues festivals in the United States